David Schittenhelm (born 13 March 1987) is a German former footballer who played as a midfielder.

External links

1987 births
Living people
German footballers
TSV 1860 Munich II players
1. FC Heidenheim players
3. Liga players
Association football midfielders